Nam Se-in (born 15 January 1993) is a South Korean football player who plays for Malaysia Premier League club UKM as an attacking midfielder.

Club career
He made his professional debut in the Segunda Liga for Académico de Viseu on 23 November 2016 in a game against Penafiel.

References

1993 births
Living people
South Korean footballers
Daegu FC players
Académico de Viseu F.C. players
South Korean expatriate footballers
Expatriate footballers in Portugal
Liga Portugal 2 players
Association football midfielders